McKenzie Pass, elevation , is a mountain pass in the Cascade Range in central Oregon in the United States.

Oregon Route 242 goes over the pass.

At the summit of the pass, Oregon Route 242 crosses a  lava flow just west of Sisters. Surrounded by lava, the Dee Wright Observatory was constructed in 1935 by Civilian Conservation Corps workers and named after their foreman.  Visitors climb to the observatory to view the Cascade peaks visible from McKenzie Pass. Also near the summit is Clear Lake, a renowned location for fresh-water diving.

Highway 242 is not recommended for large trucks, trailers or motor homes due to numerous tight switchbacks.  The pass is closed from November to July due to snow.

The pass is named for Donald McKenzie, a Scottish Canadian fur trader who explored parts of the Pacific Northwest for the Pacific Fur Company in the early 19th century.

Astronaut training
Parts of central Oregon were used as a training grounds for Apollo astronauts between 1964 and 1966.  The astronauts would practice walking on terrain that was similar to the surface of the moon.  In August 1964, Walter Cunningham struggled in a lava flow at McKenzie Pass, where he eventually fell and tore his space suit.  Cunningham piloted the lunar module on Apollo 7 in 1968.

See also
McKenzie Bridge, Oregon
McKenzie River (Oregon)

References

External links
Gerald W. Williams, McKenzie Pass at The Oregon Encyclopedia

Cascade Range
Mountain passes of Oregon
Mountain passes of the Cascades
Transportation in Deschutes County, Oregon
Transportation in Linn County, Oregon
Landforms of Deschutes County, Oregon
Landforms of Linn County, Oregon
Deschutes National Forest
Willamette National Forest